Ozark Township is an inactive township in Lawrence County, in the U.S. state of Missouri.

Ozark Township derives its name from the Ozarks.

References

Townships in Missouri
Townships in Lawrence County, Missouri